Janne Reinikainen (born 23 October 1981) is a Finnish football player currently playing for Mikkelin Palloilijat.

References
Guardian Football

1982 births
Living people
Kuopion Palloseura players
Finnish footballers
Association football defenders